Pittsburgh Northeast Airport  is a privately owned, public use airport in Allegheny County, Pennsylvania, United States. The airport is located 12 nautical miles (14 mi, 22 km) north-northeast of the central business district of Pittsburgh, in West Deer Township. The airport is located a few miles north of Pittsburgh Mills shopping mall.

This airport was included in the National Plan of Integrated Airport Systems for 2009–2013, which categorized it as a general aviation facility. It was originally known as West Penn Airport.

Facilities and aircraft 
Pittsburgh Northeast Airport covers an area of 149 acres (60 ha) at an elevation of 1,063 feet (324 m) above mean sea level. It has one runway designated 17/35 with an asphalt surface measuring 3,550 by 100 feet (1,082 x 30 m).

The property went through a major overhaul between 2000 and 2004, and can now accommodate larger aircraft. The airport's former runway, designated 2/20, had an asphalt surface measuring 2,645 by 36 feet (806 x 11 m).

For the 12-month period ending November 23, 2011, the airport had 2,982 aircraft operations, an average of 248 per month: 99% general aviation and 1% military.
At that time there were 20 aircraft based at this airport: 95% single-engine and 5% multi-engine.

The airport was bought for $9 million in 2014 by Alaskan Property Management, a subsidiary of Management Science Associates, after the former owner filed for bankruptcy.

As of March 2019 no aircraft are using the facility.

Incidents 
On May 11, 2011 shortly after 1:45pm two students, a science teacher, and a pilot attempted a takeoff on runway 35. They went off of the end of the runway and fell off of the bank.

References

External links 
 Rock Airport website
 Rock Airport at Pennsylvania DOT Bureau of Aviation
 Aerial image as of April 1993 from USGS The National Map
 

Airports in Pennsylvania
Transportation buildings and structures in Allegheny County, Pennsylvania
Privately owned airports